The Asahi Beer Hall (a.k.a. Super Dry Hall, or Flamme d'Or) is one of the buildings of the Asahi Breweries headquarters located on the east bank of the Sumida River in Sumida, Tokyo, Japan. 

It was designed by French designer Philippe Starck and was completed in 1989. It is considered one of Tokyo's most recognizable modern structures.

The shape of the building is that of a beer glass, designed to complement the neighboring golden beer mug-shaped building housing the Asahi Breweries offices.

The Asahi Flame (Flamme d'Or)
It is noted for the Asahi Flame, an enormous golden structure at the top, said to represent both the 'burning heart of Asahi beer' and a frothy head. The 360-tonne golden flame was made by shipbuilders using submarine-construction techniques. It is completely empty.

The Asahi Flame is sometimes colloquially referred to as "the golden turd" (kin no unko, 金のうんこ) and the Asahi Beer Hall itself as "poo building" (unko-biru, うんこビル).

Access
The building is a 3 minute-walk from Asakusa Station, on the opposite side of the Sumida River.

References

External links
 Asahi Beer HQ 

Office buildings in Tokyo
Office buildings completed in 1989
Buildings and structures in Sumida, Tokyo
Asahi Breweries
1989 establishments in Japan
Postmodern architecture in Japan